The Abovyan mine is a large mine in the center of Armenia in Kotayk Province. Abovyan represents one of the largest iron reserve in Armenia having estimated reserves of 255 million tonnes of ore grading 40% iron.

References 

Iron mines in Armenia